Mozilla browser may refer to one of the following web browsers produced by the Mozilla Foundation:

Mozilla Application Suite (defunct)
Mozilla Firefox (previously known as mozilla/browser, Phoenix and Mozilla Firebird)
Camino (previously known as Chimera)
Minimo (a.k.a. Mini Mozilla)
SeaMonkey (the successor to Mozilla Application Suite)